Hasbro Interactive was a software and video game subsidiary of Hasbro founded in 1995, and was sold to Infogrames in 2001.

Hasbro Interactive

Adaptations of Hasbro properties

Non-Hasbro titles

Atari Interactive

MicroProse

References 

H